The Paklenik massacre is the massacre of at least 50 Bosniaks by the Army of the Republika Srpska in the Rogatica Municipality on 15 June 1992.

Background
One day earlier, the Serb Democratic Party-led Višegrad Municipality organized a deportation of Bosniak civilians to Olovo, a town near Sarajevo. However, on its way towards the Rogatica Municipality, Bosnian Serb Army members from Višegrad stopped the buses and took all the men off to another bus. They spent the night in Rogatica and the next day they were taken to Paklenik (Hell) to a ravine called Propast (Downfall) where they were systematically executed and their bodies thrown into the ravine. Only one man survived the massacre. The men responsible for this massacre have not yet answered for their crimes. The only people who have been indicted were Mitar Vasiljević, Nenad Tanasković, Sredoje and Milan Lukić. One man, Predrag Milisavljević, was arrested in Višegrad in June 2012, suspected of having taken part in the massacre.

The remains of these executed Bosniaks were found in 2000.

See also
Visegrad massacre
Uzamnica camp
Bosanska jagodina massacre
Srebrenica massacre
Bosnian genocide
Višegrad
Milan Lukić
Mitar Vasiljević
Nenad Tanasković

References

Bosnian genocide
Massacres in 1992
Massacres in the Bosnian War
Massacres of men
1992 in Bosnia and Herzegovina
June 1992 events in Europe
Violence against men in Europe
Massacres of Bosniaks